José Dolores Estrada Morales (1869–1939), in the wake of the turmoil following José Santos Zelaya's fall, briefly served as acting President of Nicaragua for a week from 20 to 27 August 1910, before handing power to his brother, Juan José Estrada. 

Estrada was the president of the upper chamber of National Congress of Nicaragua twice between 1935 and 1939. He died during a trip to New York in 1939.

References

Presidents of Nicaragua
1869 births
1939 deaths
Presidents of the Senate (Nicaragua)
Conservative Party (Nicaragua) politicians